Rubiah binti Wang (Jawi: رابعة بنت واڠ) is a Malaysian politician who has served as the Deputy Minister of Rural and Regional Development in the Pakatan Harapan (PH) administration under Prime Minister Anwar Ibrahim and Minister Ahmad Zahid Hamidi since December 2022 and the Member of Parliament (MP) for Kota Samarahan since May 2013. She is a member of the Parti Pesaka Bumiputera Bersatu (PBB), a component party of the Gabungan Parti Sarawak (GRS) and formerly Barisan Nasional (BN) coalition.

Background
Rubiah Wang graduated from Universiti Kebangsaan Malaysia (UKM) with a Bachelor in Social Sciences. She began her career as a teacher at SMK Openg from 1992 to 1994. She then worked as a Sarawak Administrative Officer until 2006, before being promoted to the position of District Officer of Asajaya in 2007. In 2013, she resigned and participated in the 13th Malaysian General Election, running for the Kota Samarahan constituency.

Political career 
She was first elected to Parliament in the 2013 general election after winning the Kota Samarahan federal seat. She was reelected as the MP for Kota Samarahan in the 2018 and 2022 general elections.

Election results

Honours
  :
  Commander of the Order of the Territorial Crown (PMW) – Datuk (2022)

References

Living people
Parti Pesaka Bumiputera Bersatu politicians
Members of the Dewan Rakyat
Year of birth missing (living people)
Malaysian Muslims
Women members of the Dewan Rakyat
Women in Sarawak politics
National University of Malaysia alumni